Rob Akery (born 1986) is a professional poker player from Bristol, UK.

Career
Akery started playing poker in 2004, and went professional in 2005. Rob started playing poker aged 18 after receiving a $5 transfer into his account from a friend. Aged 21, Akery played his first World Series Poker Main Event. As of 2011, Akery was reported to have accumulated total live tournament winnings of $ 1,256,194.

Despite his large success at poker tournaments, Rob Akery is mainly an online high stake cash game player. While his total winnings across the different online poker sites are unknown, he is reported to have won over $1.1 million since October 2010 alone on PokerStars, according to HighStakes Poker Database  and $177,816 from the online Pokerstars Sunday Million tournament on the 4-6-2008.

Age of Mythology

Akery was previously one of the top players of Age of Mythology and was at one stage ranked as the world's top player.

Tournaments Overview

References

External links
 Rob Akery tournament results
 WPT Final Table

1986 births
Living people
English poker players